Pridorozhny is a rural locality (a settlement) in Bryzgalovskoye Rural Settlement, Kameshkovsky District, Vladimir Oblast, Russia. The population was 11 as of 2010.

Geography 
Pridorozhny is located 9 km northeast of Kameshkovo (the district's administrative centre) by road. Dmitriyevsky pogost is the nearest rural locality.

References 

Rural localities in Kameshkovsky District